Rodney King is a 2017 American one-man show directed by Spike Lee and written by and starring Roger Guenveur Smith. The film is a one-man show where Roger Guenveur Smith does a multiplicity of voices, alternately taking and opposing Rodney King's side.

Production
Roger Guenveur Smith researched and wrote/improvised the screenplay over the course of a few weeks.

Cast 
 Roger Guenveur Smith as Rodney King

Release
It was released on April 28, 2017, on Netflix streaming.

References

External links
 
 
 

2017 films
Netflix specials
2010s English-language films
American comedy-drama films
One-character films
2010s American films